Nine ships and two shore establishments of the Royal Navy have borne the name HMS Gannet, after the seabird the Gannet:

Ships
 was a 16-gun brig-sloop purchased in 1800 and sold in 1814.
 was an 18-gun  brig-sloop launched in 1814 and sold in 1838.
 was a wooden  screw sloop launched in 1857 and broken up in 1887.
 was an  screw sloop launched in 1878. She became a training ship in 1903 and was renamed HMS President, and was then lent as the training ship Mercury, she was moored in Gosport, Hampshire for many years. She was transferred as a museum ship in 1987 and is preserved in dry dock at Chatham Dockyard.
HMS Gannet was a composite  screw sloop launched in 1888 as Nymphe.  She became a base ship and was renamed Wildfire in 1906, renamed Gannet in 1916, and then Pembroke in 1917. She was sold in 1920.
HMS Gannet was a  iron screw gunboat launched in 1877 as Trent. She was renamed Pembroke in 1905, becoming a diving tender and being renamed Gannet in 1917. She was sold in 1923.
  was a river gunboat launched in 1927 and transferred to the Chinese Navy in 1942, being renamed Ying Shan. She was on their lists until 1975.

Shore establishments
 HMS Gannet was the name assigned to RNAS Eglinton, a Fleet Air Arm base in Northern Ireland, between 1943 and 1959.
 HMS Gannet II or as RNAS Maydown (HMS Shrike) was a Fleet Air Arm base from 1941 to 1947.
 HMS Gadwell with designation HMS Gannet III when it was assigned as a tender to RNAS Eglinton in 1946.
  was a Fleet Air Arm station established in 1971 at RNAS Prestwick in Ayrshire The unit closed on 5 February 2016, although the Royal Navy sometimes refers to Prestiwck Airport as HMS Gannet.

Other ships
Gannet was a tug built for the State of Victoria in 1884 and armed as an auxiliary gunboat. She was sold in 1905.
LST 3006 was launched in 1945 and commissioned as HMS Tromsø in 1947. She was transferred to the Ministry of Transport as Empire Gannet in 1956 and was sold in 1968.

References

Royal Navy ship names